Sandy Point is a township in south Gippsland, Victoria near Wilsons Promontory. It is surrounded by areas of significant natural heritage.

Sandy Point is one of the few coastal towns in the region to remain relatively unaffected by the housing boom along the coast. That is partly due to its distance from Melbourne (around 2 hours), and the fact that a lack of town sewerage has meant a ban on further sub-division.

History
The Bratowooloong people of the Gunai nation lived in the area before European settlement. The first Europeans to visit the area were three shipwrecked sailors in 1797. Irish convicts escaped south from Sydney and landed on Seal Island where several men were stranded and found by George Bass who put them ashore near Shallow Inlet to walk back to Sydney. No more was ever heard of them.

Sealers and whalers visited the area in the first half of the nineteenth century. However, it wasn't until the 1860s that the area was settled by cattle farmers. The arrival of the Gippsland railway line improved the viability of local farms and made dairy farming in the area.
The Post Office opened on 2 September 1926, and was closed in 1994.

The development of the town as a tourist location started in earnest in the 1960s but has been restricted by its natural heritage values.

Surrounding areas
The Sandy Point area has a large spit system and its shoreline, on Waratah Bay, is considered of high heritage value. Sandy Point's surf beach is patrolled during the summer months and is considered good for surfing.

Three kilometres east of Sandy Point lies a river inlet known as Shallow Inlet. This sandy, tidal inlet is a popular fishing spot and a good area for windsurfing and kitesurfing. Speed sailing records have been set there on several occasions and, in 2009, the yacht "Macquarie Innovation" broke the  speed barrier there.

Natural habitats
The area near Sandy Point contains a diverse range of habitats including mangroves, extensive stands of coastal heathland as well as remnant coastal grassy forest. It features a wide range of invertebrate species. There are large populations of white-footed dunnarts and koalas living in the region.

Until 10,000 years ago, Sandy Point was an underwater slope leading to plains now lying underneath Bass Strait.

External links
 Federal Department of Environment and Heritage Victorian heritage places
 Visit Victoria Gippsland attractions
 Shallow Inlet
 Sandy Point history
 Shallow Inlet Reference Material
 Sandy Point Community Group
 Sandy Point Surfcam

References

Coastal towns in Victoria (Australia)
Towns in Victoria (Australia)
Shire of South Gippsland